Shiraishi Dam is an earthfill dam located in Chiba Prefecture in Japan. The dam is used for water supply. The catchment area of the dam is 13.2 km2. The dam impounds about   ha of land when full and can store 800 thousand cubic meters of water. The construction of the dam was started on 1954 and completed in 1958.

References

Dams in Chiba Prefecture
1958 establishments in Japan